Billy Bishop Toronto City Water Aerodrome  is located in Toronto Harbour, Toronto, Ontario, Canada, adjacent to Billy Bishop Toronto City Airport on the Toronto Islands. Closed briefly in 2005, the aerodrome provides the only facility for floatplanes in the city. The aerodrome is classified as an airport of entry by Nav Canada and is staffed by the Canada Border Services Agency (CBSA). CBSA officers at this airport can handle general aviation aircraft only, with no more than 15 passengers.

History
The aerodrome was established in 1930 and consists of a seaplane ramp and docks on the Toronto Inner Harbour side of the Toronto Islands.

Facilities
Seaplanes or floatplanes land at the northeast end of the airport between Trans-Capital Air and the East Run-Up Bay. Trans-Capital Air provides docking and beaching assistance.

Cameron Air Services is the major seaplane operator at the aerodrome providing corporate air charters and tours.

The aerodrome is open from May to November when the harbour is not frozen over.

Control over the airspace and waterway is under the authority of Billy Bishop Toronto City Airport. No scheduled flights are allowed at the aerodrome.

See also
List of airports in the Greater Toronto Area

References

External links
 Floatplane operational procedures

Registered aerodromes in Ontario
Transport in Toronto
Seaplane bases in Ontario
Toronto Islands
Transport infrastructure completed in 1930
1930 establishments in Ontario